Birgir Guðlaugsson (28 April 1941 – 26 November 2007) was an Icelandic cross-country skier. He competed in the men's 15 kilometre event at the 1964 Winter Olympics.

References

1941 births
2007 deaths
Icelandic male cross-country skiers
Olympic cross-country skiers of Iceland
Cross-country skiers at the 1964 Winter Olympics
20th-century Icelandic people